Evolution with Pete Tong, also known as Evolution Beatport Show, is the name of a former radio show created and hosted by British DJ, producer, record producer and radio personality Pete Tong. The show, which aired on iHeartRadio's digital radio platform of the same name and iHeartMedia's HD2 and FM radios in the U.S., was a two-hour format that featured electronic dance music with songs from the Beatport charts as well as select mixes from various guest DJs from around the world. The show aired on select stations in the U.S. and other countries around the world.

See also
Evolution (radio network)

References

External links

Listen to Evolution with Pete Tong on iHeartRadio

2013 radio programme debuts
American music radio programs
Electronic music radio shows